Lieutenant General Herbert R. Temple Jr. (born February 28, 1928) is a career military officer who served as Chief of the National Guard Bureau.

Early life
Herbert Ralph Temple Jr. was born in Los Angeles, California on February 28, 1928.  He graduated from Polytechnic High School in 1947 and enlisted as a private in the 160th Infantry Regiment, 40th Infantry Division.

Korean War
In September 1950, he deployed for the Korean War, serving as a sergeant in Company B, 5th Regimental Combat Team, 24th Infantry Division.  Temple earned the Combat Infantryman Badge during the war.

Post Korean War
He returned to California in 1952 and received a direct commission as a second lieutenant in the 160th Infantry Regiment.  Temple continued his college education and entered private business, becoming vice president and a partner in V.B. Morgan Petroleum and Chemical Trucking Company of Long Beach.

In 1954, Temple received an Associate of Arts degree in marketing from Los Angeles City College.

Temple became qualified in Armor in 1955, and commanded Headquarters and Headquarters Company, Combat Command A, 40th Infantry Division.  He then joined the staff of the 40th Infantry Division, including assignments as Assistant Deputy Chief of Staff for Personnel and Deputy Chief of Staff for Personnel, G1.

In 1966, Temple graduated from the United States Army Command and General Staff College.  The same year he was assigned to the 40th Division Support Command as Personnel Staff Officer, S1.  He then commanded the 40th Supply and Transportation Battalion, followed by command of 3rd Battalion, 160th Infantry.

Later military career
In July 1968, Temple was assigned to California National Guard headquarters, where he served as operations and training officer, followed by command of the California Military Academy.  Along with those assignments, he also served as Military Assistant to Governor Ronald Reagan.

From 1971 to 1974, Temple was Deputy Commander of the 49th Infantry Brigade and then Commander of 3rd Brigade, 40th Infantry Division.  During this period, he was also appointed by Governor Reagan to serve as Director of the California Office of Emergency Services.

In 1974, he received a Bachelor of Science degree in management from Golden Gate University.  In 1975, he completed the United States Army War College, and also graduated from Shippensburg State University with a Master of Science degree in public administration.

National Guard Bureau

In September 1975, Temple was assigned to the National Guard Bureau as Chief of the Office of Mobilization and Readiness.  After completing this assignment, he served as Chief of the Office of Policy and Congressional Liaison.

In 1978, he was appointed Deputy Director of the Army National Guard and promoted to brigadier general.  He was succeeded by Richard D. Dean.

Temple became Director of the Army National Guard in 1982, and was promoted to major general.  He was succeeded by Donald Burdick.

In 1986, General Temple was named Chief of the National Guard Bureau and promoted to lieutenant general.  He served until retiring in 1990.

Awards
General Temple's awards and decorations include: Defense Distinguished Service Medal; Army Distinguished Service Medal (2); Air Force Distinguished Service Medal; Legion of Merit; Meritorious Service Medal; Army Commendation Medal; Air Force Commendation Medal; Combat Infantryman Badge; and Army Staff Identification Badge.

His foreign honors include: Swedish Home Guard Medal of Merit; French National Order of Merit; and Swedish Order of the Polar Star.

Civic and professional memberships
Temple was a member of the National Guard Association of the United States, National Guard Association of California, Association of the United States Army, Fifth Regimental Combat Team Association and Marines Memorial Association.  He is a senior member of the Los Angeles Athletic Club and a member of Al Malaikah Shrine.  Temple also served as Chief of Staff for the Military Order of the World Wars.

Retirement
After retiring from the military, Temple was a defense consultant for government and private business, and led congressional directed studies related to civil-military planning for defense from weapons of mass destruction.  He also served on Secretary of Defense study groups on Quality of Life in the Armed Forces and Readiness of the Armed Forces.

Temple moved to Palm Desert, California and became active in local affairs. He is past president of Lincoln Club of the Coachella Valley and past president of the World Affairs Council of the Desert.  He was also appointed to serve on the Riverside County Veterans Committee.

Legacy
The conference facility at the Camp San Luis Obispo officers' club is named the Herbert R. Temple Center.

Fort Leavenworth's Mission Training Complex includes the Herbert R. Temple, Jr. Leadership Training Center.

Camp Joseph T. Robinson, Arkansas is the home of the Herbert R. Temple, Jr. Marksmanship Training Center.

The Herbert R. Temple, Jr. Papers are part of the collections of the U.S. Army Heritage and Education Center.

In April 2014 the armory in Moreno Valley, California was named the Lt. Gen. Herbert R. Temple, Jr. Army National Guard Readiness Center.

In February 2017 the Army National Guard named its Arlington Hall Station headquarters the Herbert R. Temple, Jr. Army National Guard Readiness Center.

Personal
Temple married Patricia Ann Riley on July 30, 1949.  They had met while in college, and she worked at Metro-Goldwyn-Mayer Studios and as personal secretary for Rod Serling.  The Temples had no children, and Mrs. Temple died in Rancho Mirage, California on April 22, 2014.

References

External links

Herbert Temple at The National Guard Education Foundation
Herbert Temple at Camp Roberts Historical Museum

1928 births
Living people
United States Army personnel of the Korean War
Chiefs of the National Guard Bureau
Golden Gate University alumni
John H. Francis Polytechnic High School alumni
Los Angeles City College alumni
Military personnel from California
National Guard (United States) generals
Order of the Polar Star
People from Los Angeles
People from Palm Desert, California
Recipients of the Defense Distinguished Service Medal
Recipients of the Distinguished Service Medal (US Army)
Recipients of the Air Force Distinguished Service Medal
Recipients of the Legion of Merit
Shippensburg University of Pennsylvania alumni
United States Army Command and General Staff College alumni
United States Army generals
United States Army War College alumni
Recipients of the Meritorious Service Medal (United States)